Roman Grigoryev (born November 16, 1990) is a Russian-Dutch former professional basketball player. Grigoryev is 2.00 m tall and primarily played the power forward position. He played two seasons professionally in respectively the Netherlands and on Cyprus.

Career
Grigoryev played three seasons for the under-23 team of Spartak Primore Vladivostok from 2010 till 2013.

On June 24, 2013 Grigoryev signed with Maxxcom BSW in the Netherlands. Grigoryev got a place in the DBL All-Rookie Team, after he averaged 12.1 points and 5.3 rebounds in 12 league games.

For the 2014–15 season he signed with the Cypriotic team Omonia Nicosia.

Honors
DBL All-Rookie Team (1): 2013–14

References

External links
Profile at Eurobasket.com

1990 births
Living people
Dutch Basketball League players
Dutch men's basketball players
Russian men's basketball players
BSW (basketball club) players
Power forwards (basketball)